Belsey is a surname. Notable people with the surname include:

Bill Belsey, Canadian politician
Catherine Belsey (1940–2021), British literary critic and academic
Hugh Belsey (born 1954), British art historian
Ian Belsey, lyric baritone
Belsey family in On Beauty

See also
Besley, a surname
Belsay, Northumberland, England